The Saro A.21 Windhover was a British amphibious aircraft from the  period between World War I and World War II, constructed by Saunders-Roe, or Saro.  It was originally advertised as the A.19 Thermopylae after the famous clipper ship, being an enlarged version of the Saro Cutty Sark.

Development
When tests to improve the power of the Saro A.17 Cutty Sark by adding a third de Havilland Gipsy II engine proved impractical (due to the additional weight on the small airframe), Saro designed a larger aircraft on similar lines that could indeed carry three Gipsy II engines.  Although a technically successful aircraft and nearly viceless in service, it was a type with a very limited market and only two were built.

Production aircraft
 A.21/1, prototype first flown at Cowes 16 October 1930, registered ZK-ABW for delivery to Dominion Airways of New Zealand.  Aircraft sold in September 1931 to Matthews Aviation of Melbourne, Victoria and placed on the Australian register as VH-UPB.  Between January 1933 and February 1934 operated a regular Bass Strait passenger service between Melbourne and Launceston, Tasmania via King Island.  On 13 May 1936 it was damaged beyond repair when blown ashore at King Island while on a charter with a party of game hunters.  The hull was salvaged and ended its days as an instructional airframe in Melbourne during the Second World War before being demolished.
 A.21/2, first and only production example, completed July 1931. After modifications (addition of auxiliary winglet over engines to improve air flow and lift), it was sold to Francis Francis as G-ABJP, who onsold it in September to Gibraltar Airways for the Gibraltar-Tangier route. In July 1932, it was sold to The Hon Mrs Victor Bruce and named City of Portsmouth. The undercarriage was temporarily removed, and during August 1932, it was used in three attempts to break the world flight-refuelled endurance record. That was not achieved, and in May 1935, the aircraft was sold to Jersey Airways, being taken out of service in 1938.

Specifications (A.21/2 Amphibian)

See also

Notes

References

Lewis, Peter. 1970. British Racing and Record-Breaking Aircraft. Putnam  

The Advocate (newspaper, Burnie Tasmania) 22 September 1931, 14 May 1936, 4 June 1936, 3 August 1942.

Flying boats
1930s British airliners
Trimotors
Amphibious aircraft
Windhover
Aircraft first flown in 1930
Sesquiplanes